Mirko (Cyrillic script: Мирко) is a masculine given name of South Slavic origin. 

By Slavic etymology, the name is composed of the root mir (meaning peace) and hypocoristic suffix -ko usual in South Slavic languages, which together means "the peaceful one". Mirko is sometimes used as a short, hypocoristic form of Miroslav in some Slavic languages. 

The name is widely popular in Serbia, Croatia, Bulgaria, Bosnia and Herzegovina, Montenegro, Slovenia, Italy and Germany. An alternative spelling in Italian and German is Mirco. The nationality of those men with the forename Mirko who are from outside the Slavic region is listed next to the name.

Notable men with the forename Mirko:

Prince Mirko of Montenegro
Mirko Alilović
Mirko Bašić
Mirko Bellodi, Italian
Mirko Bogović
Mirko Boland, German
Mirko Bolesan, Italian
Mirko Bortolotti, Italian
Mirko Bröder, Hungarian
Mirko Bunjevčević
Mirko Casper, German
Mirko Castillo, Peruvian
Mirko Celestino, Italian
Mirko Corsano, Italian
Mirko Cvetković
Mirko Damjanović
Mirko Derenčin
Mirko Dickhaut, German
Mirko Dorner, German
Mirko Eichhorn, German
Mirko Ellis, Italian
Mirko Englich, German
Mirko Eramo, Italian
Mirko Fait, Italian
Mirko Filipović, better known as Mirko Cro Cop
Mirko Gashi, Albanian
Mirko Giacomo Nenzi, Italian
Mirko Giansanti, Italian
Mirko Gori, Italian
Mirko Grabovac
Mirko Grmek
Mirko Guadalupi, Italian
Mirko Höfflin, German
Mirko Hrgović
Mirko Ilić
Mirko Ivanić
Mirko Ivanovski
Mirko Jeličić, Australian
Mirko Jović
Mirko Jozić
Mirko Jurkovic, American
Mirko Kokotović
Mirko Koršič
Mirko Kovač (basketball)
Mirko Kovač (writer)
Mirko Kramarić
Mirko Lamantia, Italian
Mirko Lang, German
Mirko Marić
Mirko Marjanović
Mirko Martucci, Italian
Mirko Mihić
Mirko Mikić
Mirko Milašević
Mirko Mulalić
Mirko Murovic, Canadian
Mirko Müller, German
Mirko Nišović
Mirko Norac Kevo
Mirko Novosel
Mirko Oremuš
Mirko Paetzold, German
Mirko Palazzi, Sammarinese
Mirko Petrović (athlete)
Mirko Petrović (politician)
Mirko Petrović-Njegoš
Mirko Pieri, Italian
Mirko Pigliacelli, Italian
Mirko Plantić
Mirko Plivelic , Argentinean
Mirko Puzović
Mirko Rački
Mirko Radovanović
Mirko Radović
Mirko Raičević
Mirko Ruggiu, Sardinian King
Mirko Salvi, Swiss
Mirko Sandić
Mirko Savini, Italian
Mirko Savone, Italian
Mirko Schuster, German
Mirko Selak
Mirko and Stjepan Seljan
Mirko Selvaggi, Italian
Mirko Serrano, Chilean
Mirko Slomka, German
Mirko Stojanović
Mirko Szewczuk, German
Mirko Šarović
Mirko Spada, Swiss
Mirko Stangalino, Italian
Mirko Taccola, Italian
Mirko Tedeschi (cyclist, born 1987), Italian
Mirko Tedeschi (cyclist, born 1989), Italian
Mirko Teodorović
Mirko Tomassoni, Sammarinese
Mirko Tremaglia, Italian
Mirko Trosino, Italian
Mirko Turri, Italian
Mirko Uhlig, German
Mirko Valdifiori, Italian
Mirko Vičević
Mirko Vidaković
Mirko Vidović
Mirko Vindiš
Mirko Virius
Mirko Vučinić
Mirko Vuillermin, Italian
Mirko Wolter, German

See also
Mirco
Mirković
Slavic names

Bosnian masculine given names
Bulgarian masculine given names
Croatian masculine given names
German masculine given names
Italian masculine given names
Macedonian masculine given names
Serbian masculine given names
Slavic masculine given names